José Guilherme de Toledo (born 11 January 1994) is a Brazilian handball player who plays for Recoletas Atlético Valladolid and the Brazilian national team.

Career
José Toledo was born in São Paulo and started to play handball in the local club Handebol Itapema. In August 2013, Toledo was called-up to the national youth team of Brazil for the World Championship campaign. Toledo led his national team to the 9th place after beating Spain in the group stage and Hungary in the 9th place game. He finished the tournament as the top goalscorer, with 64 goals.

One year later, in the summer of 2014, Toledo signed a three-year contract with Spanish team BM Granollers. In his first season in European handball, Toledo scored 107 goals in 27 appearances in all competitions, which made him a key player in the rotation of BM Granollers, one of the most successful clubs in Spain. Toledo started the following season with 47 goals in nine games in Liga ASOBAL.

In November 2015, he joined Polish powerhouse Wisła Płock on a two-year contract. He made his debut in EHF Champions League against Beşiktaş, scoring four goals. He finished his first season with 82 goals, 30 of which were scored in the Champions League.

Toledo was part of the squad of Brazil senior team to the 2015 World Championship in Qatar. He also won the 2016 Pan-American Championship with Brazil and was part of the squad in the 2016 Olympic Games in Rio de Janeiro.

Achievements
2018 Pan American Men's Handball Championship: Best right back

References

External links

1994 births
Living people
Brazilian male handball players
Handball players from São Paulo
Handball players at the 2016 Summer Olympics
Olympic handball players of Brazil
Expatriate handball players in Poland
Brazilian expatriate sportspeople in Poland
Brazilian expatriate sportspeople in Spain
Wisła Płock (handball) players
Liga ASOBAL players
BM Granollers players
South American Games gold medalists for Brazil
South American Games medalists in handball
Competitors at the 2018 South American Games
Handball players at the 2020 Summer Olympics
21st-century Brazilian people